Jonathan Michael "Jonny" Rowell (born 10 September 1989) is an English footballer who plays as a midfielder for Challenger Pro League side Dender EH.

Rowell has predominantly spent his career in Belgium and played in the Belgian Pro League for Waasland-Beveren, as well as lower league sides Olympic Charleroi and Berchem Sport. Rowell has also played in English Football League for Hartlepool United and in the Netherlands for Eerste Divisie side FC Eindhoven.

Career
Jonny began playing football for Newcastle United in their academy since he was nine up until he his was 16. Whilst in the Under-16s, he played alongside future England international Andy Carroll. After being let go by the Premiership club, the midfielder was signed by League One club Hartlepool United after a successful trial in January 2006.

He signed an early first team contract in January 2008 to keep him with North-East club, due to apparent interest from other clubs.

Rowell was named in the first team squad in the 2007–08 season against Crewe Alexandra and Bristol Rovers, however in both games he was an unused sub. Later in the season, an injury in a reserve team match ruled him out for the rest of the season. He went on to win the Youth Team's Player of the Year at the end of the season as voted for by the Hartlepool supporters.

Rowell made his first appearance for Hartlepool United the season after in a Football League Trophy game against fellow League One side Leicester City on 2 September 2008, however Hartlepool went on to lose this match 3–0. He made his first ever League start for an injury struck Hartlepool, just three months later against Hereford United. Hartlepool boss Danny Wilson said that he thought "Rowell's debut was terrific". He was then released by Chris Turner at the end of the 2009–10 season and signed for Belgian Third Division B side Olympic Charleroi on 7 July 2010 where he soon became a fan favourite. Olympic Charleroi finished 8th at the end of the season.

At the end of the 2010–11 season, Rowell went on trial with English Conference National side Gateshead, however he ended up signing for Belgian Second Division side Waasland-Beveren on a free transfer. In his first season with Waasland-Beveren, they won promotion via the play-offs to Belgian Pro League. He made his first appearance in the Belgian Pro League in a 1–2 victory against Beerschot AC on 24 November 2021.

Rowell turned down a new contract with Waasland-Beveren at the end of the 2014–15 season to pursue a deal elsewhere. However, he missed out on a season of football because of deals falling through and broken promises. In August 2016, Rowell signed for Eerste Divisie side FC Eindhoven. Rowell made 13 appearances for the Dutch side before moving back to Belgium signing for Berchem Sport in January 2018.

Rowell signed for Belgian National Division 1 side Dender EH in August 2018. In September 2020, Dender coach Regi Van Acker confirmed that he had turned a transfer bid for Rowell from fellow National Division 1 side K.S.V. Roeselare. On 21 April 2021, Rowell signed a two-year contract extension with Dender.

Personal life
Rowell attended Emmanuel College in Gateshead. He has dual British–Belgian nationality. He is a fan of his local side Premier League side Newcastle United, the side where Rowell spent eight years as a junior but Rowell also follows the results of his former club Hartlepool.

In December 2018, he got married and on 1 September 2019, his wife gave birth to their son Jack. Only five days later, Rowell scored in a 2-0 derby win for Dender EH against RWD Molenbeek – a game that his wife insisted he played in.

Career statistics

A.  The "Other" column constitutes appearances and goals (including those as a substitute) in the Football League Trophy and play-off games.

Honours
Hartlepool United
Youth Team Player of the Season: 2007–08

Waasland-Beveren
Belgian Second Division play-offs: 2011–12

F.C.V. Dender E.H.
Belgian National Division 1: 2021–22

References

External links
Rowell's Official Hartlepool United Profile
Rowell's Official Waasland-Beveren Profile
Rowell's Official Dender Profile

1989 births
Living people
Footballers from Newcastle upon Tyne
English footballers
Association football midfielders
Newcastle United F.C. players
Hartlepool United F.C. players
R. Olympic Charleroi Châtelet Farciennes players
S.K. Beveren players
FC Eindhoven players
K. Berchem Sport players
F.C.V. Dender E.H. players
English Football League players
Challenger Pro League players
Belgian Pro League players
Eerste Divisie players
English expatriate footballers
Expatriate footballers in Belgium
English expatriate sportspeople in Belgium
Expatriate footballers in the Netherlands
English expatriate sportspeople in the Netherlands